Thura Al-Windawi is an Iraqi writer. She is the author of Thura's Diary, which was written by her on the eve of and during the Iraq War. It shows her life during this time and explains the harsh times there were. Later, it was published and it caught the attention of a British journalist. She was born in 1983 to a British-educated father and a middle-class Iraqi mother and attended both the University of Baghdad and the University of Pennsylvania; she studied pharmacology at Baghdad.

References

External links
Thura al-Windawi Bio

1983 births
Living people
Iraqi diarists
Iraqi women writers
Iraqi writers
American people of Iraqi descent
University of Baghdad alumni
University of Pennsylvania alumni